The antelope jackrabbit (Lepus alleni) is a species of North American hare found in southern Arizona and northwestern Mexico that occupies dry desert areas.

Behaviour
It is most active during twilight (crepuscular) and during the night (nocturnal), but can be active during the day when conditions are favorable (heavy cloud coverage).

Evolutionary history 
Fossil evidence places the genus Lepus in North America approximately 2.5 million years ago. A now extinct jackrabbit species, Lepus giganteus, was thought to exist in North America during this time. This species shared similar physical traits with the antelope jackrabbit, making it difficult to differentiate fossils of the two species. In a 2014 study, researchers hypothesized that L. giganteus served as a common ancestor to the antelope jackrabbit and black-tailed jackrabbit. The black-tailed jackrabbit coexists with the antelope jackrabbit and the two species maintain a sympatric relationship. In the same 2014 study, genetic analysis concluded that three Lepus species share a common white-sided jackrabbit ancestor: L. callotis (white-sided jackrabbit), L. alleni (antelope jackrabbit), and L. flavigularis (Tehuantepec jackrabbit). Based on this evidence, researchers also concluded that the black-tailed jackrabbit, though closely related to white-sided jackrabbits, exists in its own separate subclade.

Geographic range
In the United States, the antelope jackrabbit is found in parts of Arizona and states like Chihuahua, Nayarit, Sinaloa and Sonora in Northwestern Mexico. Compared to the other hare species present in North America, the antelope jackrabbit's range is limited. This species does not inhabit areas further east than the sky islands in Arizona and the Sierra Madre Occidental in Mexico. It also does not radiate west of Florence, Arizona. As of July 2017 it had been spotted and photographed by a National Park Ranger in the Lake Mead Recreational Area in Nevada.

Habitat
The antelope jackrabbit is found in a variety of tropic and subtropic habitats. It can be found in grassy hills or plains, preferring habitats with large, desert shrubs above long grass. This species can also be found in more barren desert habitats. A 2014 study focusing on ecology indicated that the ideal habitat for an antelope jackrabbit includes grassy ground cover and a mesquite overstory. This species does not prefer an arid climate; instead, antelope jackrabbits live in areas with summer precipitation amounts ranging from 90 mm to 360 mm. Unlike the black-tailed jackrabbit which survives in less humid conditions, the antelope jackrabbit inhabits locations with higher humidity.

Description

The antelope jackrabbit is a large Lepus species. Male and female antelope jackrabbits are identical in appearance. This species is large in size with long, pointed ears and a distinct coat coloration. The antelope jackrabbit has a white belly, light grey sides, a back peppered with black, and orange coloration on the neck and chest. It is similar to species like the black-tailed jackrabbit and white-sided jackrabbit. Its body length ranges from 52 to 58 cm (22 in) long and its tail can be 5 to 10 cm (3 in) long. Its front legs grow to be 10 to 20 cm (3.9 to 7.9 in) and the back legs can grow to be 20 to 30 cm (7.9 to 11.8 in) long. The species has a very large skull and a long rostrum. Its ears are extremely long with white on the point and edges. The bi-colored tail is black on top and a pale grey below.

Feeding 
The antelope jackrabbit feeds on cacti, grasses, mesquite leaves and other leafy vegetation. This species has been observed digging and eating soil in an attempt to intake minerals and other nutrients. They can be classified as folivores and graminivores.

Reproduction 
Antelope jackrabbits breed from December to September and the gestation period is roughly six weeks long. Females have up to four litters per year ranging from one to five individuals. A baby hare, called a leveret, is born precocial; its eyes are open, it is active, and covered with fur. Young are born in shallow dirt nests that are formed by scraping the surface of the ground.

Threats 
Known predators of the antelope jackrabbit include bobcats, coyotes, and golden eagles. Since antelope jackrabbits attract predators that are also a threat to livestock, they are hunted by humans to reduce potential problems. This species is also hunted for human consumption or for their valuable pelt.

Habitat loss also poses a threat to antelope jackrabbits because agricultural expansion is interfering with their habitats. Grazing livestock reduce the abundance of grasses and herbaceous plants in areas where antelope jackrabbits reside.

Subspecies
There are three recognized subspecies:
L a. i alleni
L. a. palitans
L. a. tiburonensis

See also
Jackalope - a fictional cross between an antelope and a jackrabbit

References

External links

University of Michigan: Lepus alleni

Lepus
Mammals of Mexico
Mammals of the United States
Fauna of the Sonoran Desert
Fauna of the Southwestern United States
Natural history of Arizona
Natural history of Sonora
Mammals described in 1890